James Alfred Connolly (born 2 November 2001) is a Welsh professional footballer who plays as a central defender for Bristol Rovers and the Wales under-21 national football team.

Club career

Early career
Connolly began his career with Blackburn Rovers, signing a two-year scholarship contract with the club in June 2018. Despite missing the majority of the 2019–20 season through an injury sustained in October 2019, Connolly had his scholarship extended by a further year being released by the club at the end of the following season. In June 2021, Connolly signed with Cardiff City. Connolly was retained by the club ahead of the 2022–23 season.

Bristol Rovers
On 8 January 2022, Connolly joined League Two side Bristol Rovers on loan for the remainder of the 2021–22 season. He made his senior debut later that day in a 2–1 FA Cup Third Round defeat to Peterborough United, and his league debut came on 22 January 2022. Connolly formed a solid defensive partnership with fellow Championship loanee Connor Taylor, being praised for his composure on the ball and his ability to adapt to the physical demands of League Two football. Connolly scored a first senior goal in a vital match against promotion rivals Port Vale, turning home an Antony Evans cross to give Rovers the lead having fallen behind early on, Rovers going on to win 3–1. Connolly's first season in professional football ended in success as Rovers were promoted on the final day of the season, a 7–0 victory moving Bristol Rovers into third place, beating Northampton Town to automatic promotion on goals scored.

He re-joined Bristol Rovers on a permanent deal, transferring for an undisclosed sum, in June 2022, signing a three-year contract. On 6 August 2022, Connolly scored his first goal since returning to the club on a permanent basis with the second in a 4–0 thrashing of Burton Albion. On 27 August 2022, it was revealed that Connolly had suffered a stress fracture in his back that would see him out of action for a 'long period'. On 29 October, Connolly made his return to first-team football as a substitute in a 4–2 defeat at Derby County.

International career
In May 2022, Connolly was called up to the Wales U21 team for the first time for the final 2023 U21 European Championship qualifiers against the Netherlands and Gibraltar. Connolly made his debut in the latter of these matches as Wales won 2–0.

Career statistics

Honours
Bristol Rovers
League Two promotion: 2021–22

References

2001 births
Living people
Welsh footballers
Blackburn Rovers F.C. players
Cardiff City F.C. players
Bristol Rovers F.C. players
English Football League players
Association football defenders
Wales under-21 international footballers